Gianni Manfrin (born 13 August 1993) is an Italian football player who plays for Virtus Verona.

Club career
He made his Serie B debut for Modena on 24 August 2013 in a game against Palermo.

On 23 December 2018, he signed with Virtus Verona. He left the club as a free agent at the end of the 2020–21 season. On 22 January 2022, he signed a new contract with Virtus Verona for the remainder of the 2021–22 season.

Personal life
On 31 January 2023, Manfrin was charged with gang rape and sentenced to six years in prison together with four other former teammates of his from his first period at Virtus Verona.

References

External links
 

1993 births
Sportspeople from the Province of Padua
Footballers from Veneto
Living people
Italian footballers
Italy youth international footballers
A.C. ChievoVerona players
Modena F.C. players
U.S. Alessandria Calcio 1912 players
A.C. Reggiana 1919 players
Virtus Verona players
Serie B players
Serie C players
Association football defenders